The Swimming competition at the 2010 Summer Youth Olympics lasted from August 15 to 20, at the Singapore Sports School.

Competition schedule

Day 1

Day 2

Day 3

Day 4

Day 5

Day 6

Medal summary

Medal table

Events

Boys' Events

Girls' Events

Mixed Events

 Swimmers who participated in the heats only and received medals.

Participating nations

153 nations will participate in swimming.

References

Schedule

 
Youth Olympics
2010 Summer Youth Olympics events
2010
Summer Youth Olympics